HanCinema is an independent South Korean movie and drama database created by Cédric Collemine during the summer of 2003 in Korea. It provides information related to Korean movies, television dramas, actors, and other related information. It is aimed at non-South Korean audiences.

See also
 Internet Movie Database
 Korean Movie Database

References

External links
 

South Korean film websites
Internet properties established in 2003
Online film databases